Wyoming Territory's at-large congressional district is an obsolete congressional district that encompassed the area of the Wyoming Territory. After Wyoming's admission to the Union as the 44th state by act of Congress on July 10, 1890, this district was dissolved and replaced by Wyoming's at-large congressional district.

List of delegates representing the district 
On July 25, 1868, an act of Congress gave Wyoming Territory the authority to elect a Congressional delegate, although the first delegate did not take his seat until 1869.

References

Former congressional districts of the United States
At-large United States congressional districts
Territory At-large